Khlong Lam Kong is a watercourse in Phetchabun Province, Thailand. It is a tributary of the Pa Sak River, part of the Chao Phraya River basin.

Kong